Biga power station (also known as Bekirli-1 or İçdaş Çelik Enerji or İÇDAŞ Değirmencik and different from nearby İÇDAŞ Biga-2 but owned by the same company) is a 405 MW coal-fired power station in Turkey in Değirmencik, Biga, in Çanakkale built in the early 21st century.

It is estimated that closing the plant by 2030, instead of when its licence ends in 2056, would prevent over 2000 premature deaths.

References

External links 

 Biga power station on Global Energy Monitor

Coal-fired power stations in Turkey